Splendid China was a theme park in Four Corners, Florida. It was opened in 1993 but closed on December 31, 2003. It was a sister park to the Splendid China in Shenzhen, China, and cost $100 million to build.

It was a  miniature park with more than 60 replicas at a one-tenth scale at its height of popularity. Each piece was handcrafted to maintain authenticity. Initially, Chinese artists were hired to perform in the park. After a number of them tried to seek political asylum in the United States, they were replaced by local performers.

Citizens Against Communist Chinese Propaganda criticized the Chinese government's ownership of Splendid China; the state-owned corporation China Travel Service owned and operated the theme park.

History

Origins
The original idea for the Florida Splendid China theme park was that of Josephine Chen, a former educator from Taiwan. In 1988, Chen toured a prototype park, "Splendid China Miniature Scenic Spot", in Shenzhen, China operated by China Travel Service (CTS). This park is close to Hong Kong. 3.5 million people visited the park during the first year. CTS recouped its US$100 million investment during this first year.

She negotiated an agreement with CTS, controlled by Overseas Chinese Affairs Office, under the China National Tourism Administration. Under the agreement, Chen supplied the land and management services, while CTS would construct the building, and supply non-management personnel.

Construction
On December 19, 1989, groundbreaking ceremonies were held for the start of construction for Florida Splendid China.

The replica of the Leshan Buddha was four stories tall.

Buyout
In December 1993, the American partners were bought out by the Chinese government.

Changes in 1996
In May 1996, the Orlando Sentinel reported that the President, General Manager, and Senior Vice-President for Entertainment were replaced in what was described as a 'big management shakeup'.

In July 1996, the Orlando Business Journal reported that Florida Splendid China was changing their name to "Chinatown." In August 1996, the Orlando Business Journal reported that marketing department of Florida Splendid China had shrunk by 5 positions.

FARA violation
In March 1998, the Orlando Sentinel reported that Citizens Against Communist Chinese Propaganda asked Attorney General Janet Reno and the US Department of Justice to investigate Florida Splendid China for violation of the Foreign Agents Registration Act.

In May 1999, the Far East Economic Review reported that Florida Splendid China was losing $9 million a year.

Protests and bans
A group called Citizens Against Communist Chinese Propaganda (CACCP) staged several protests at the park against perceived Chinese Communist Party propaganda in the Mongolian and Tibetan exhibits.

In November 1995, the Pinellas County, Florida school board voted to ban trips to Florida Splendid China.
In March 1996, at the 11th demonstration against perceived Chinese Communist Party propaganda in the Tibetan, Mongolian and Eastern Turkestan exhibits, five college students sat down and closed the front gate Florida Splendid China while a large crowd of demonstrators watched.

On April 19, 1996 the Representative Assembly of the 1996 Florida Teaching Professionals-NEA State Conference in Orlando passed a resolution to ban personal or school trips to Florida Splendid China by its members. The resolution passed overwhelmingly.

In October 1997, the brother of the 14th Dalai Lama of Tibet (Takster Rinpoche), attended the 20th demonstration at Florida Splendid China to commemorate the 48th anniversary of takeover of Eastern Turkestan.

In December 1999, CACCP held the 32nd demonstration at the main gate of Florida Splendid China to commemorate the 6th anniversary of the Grand Opening.

Plans for closure
In May 2000, the Orlando Business Journal reported that Sunny Yang, Florida Splendid China president, confirmed that the motel property was about to change hands and that sources close to the attraction had said that the park was to be sold and closed.

In November 2000, the Orlando Business Journal reported that amid allegations of financial mismanagement, the former president (Sunny Yang) of the struggling Splendid China attraction has been sent back to mainland China.

After closure

After closing its gates, Splendid China suffered a rash of attacks from thieves and vandals. Hundreds of items were taken ranging from small miniatures to portions of life-size statues.  The perpetrators, thought to be local youths, were never caught. The property has passed through several owners and in July 2009 was up for sale at an asking price of $30 million.

On May 9, 2013, the new owners started to tear down the park.

In August 2015, Encore Homes reported that Margaritaville Resort would open on the former Splendid China site, with resort homes, condos and timeshares in Jimmy Buffett themed setting.

By March 2016, there was nothing left of the park as construction had begun for the new Margaritaville resort. The former park is located on a parcel of the southern and eastern property of the resort bordering Fins Up Circle, Formosa Gardens Blvd. and Funnie Steed Rd.

Exhibits

  The Mogao
  The Mogao Grottoes Cave 
  The Yungang Grottoes
  The Longmen Grottoes
 Leshan Buddha in Sichuan province
  Buddhist Stone Sculptures in Dazu 
 Midair Temple 
 Cliffside Tombs
 Stone Forest Yunnan Province 
 Shanhai Pass of the Great Wall
 Nine Dragon Wall
  Mongolian Yurt
 Mausoleum of Genghis Khan in Inner Mongolia
 The Great Wall
 1000 Eyes and 1000 Hands Guanyin Buddha Statue 
 Xiang Fei's Tomb (Tomb of Apak Hoja)
 Id Kah Mosque 
  Panda Playground 
 Bai Dwelling Houses 
 Three Ancient Pagodas in Dali 
 Manfeilong Pagoda
  The Dai Village
 Jinzhen Octagonal Pavilion
 Potala Palace in Tibet
 Lijiang River Scenery 
 Foshan Ancestral Temple  in Guangdong Province
 Zhenghai Tower 
 Dwelling House of the Hakkas 
 Water Village 
 Tengwang Pavilion
 West Lake Scenery in Hangzhou
 Town God Temple
  Chinese Garden 
 Temple of Confucius 
 Summer Palace in Beijing
 Zhaozhou
  Lugouqiao (Marco Polo Bridge) in Beijing
 Forbidden City in Beijing
 Jin Gang Bao Zuo Pagoda
  The White Pagoda in Miaoying Temple in Beijing
 Yingxian Wooden Pagoda
 Terra Cotta Warriors and Horses of Qin Shihuang Mausoleum
 Big Wild Goose Pagoda in Xi'an
 Jiayuguan Pass of the Great Wall
 Ancient Star-Observatory 
  Memorial Temple of Zhuge Liang (Temple of Marquis Wu)
 Buyi Village
 Miao Village 
 Wind and Rain Bridge, Drum Tower of the Dong 
 Yueyang Pavilion (Tower) 
 Yellow Crane Tower in Wuhan
 Feihong Pagoda 
 Shaolin Temple 
 Pagoda Forest at Shaolin Temple
 Jin Ancestral Temple 
 Temple of Heaven in Beijing, and seen at China Pavilion at Epcot
 Sun Yat-sen Mausoleum in Nanjing

References

External links
A photo gallery
Archive website of effort against Florida Splendid China
 “Forbidden City: Can a new CEO lift the veil – and revenues – at China's troubled theme park in Orlando?”; Cynthia Barnett; Florida Trend magazine; June 2001
“Developer devotes energy to Four Corners”; Nancy Pfister; The Journal of Osceola County Business, January 1997
“Florida Splendid China”; Kenneth R. Timmerman, American Spectator Magazine; February 1999
Defunct amusement parks in Florida
1993 establishments in Florida
2003 disestablishments in Florida
Roadside attractions in Florida
Miniature parks
China–United States economic relations